The 2012–13 season is Atalanta Bergamasca Calcio's hundredth fifth season in existence and the club's second consecutive season in the top flight of Italian football. The club was punished with a two-point deduction plus a €25,000 fine at the start of the season, due to involvement in the 2011–12 Italian football scandal.

Players

Current squad

Transfers 
 Only first players.

In 

Total spending:  €8,500,000

Out 

Total gaining:  €9,700,000

Competitions

Serie A

League table

Matches
All time are in CEST/CET

Coppa Italia

Squad statistics

Appearances and goals

|-
! colspan="10" style="background:#dcdcdc; text-align:center"| Goalkeepers

|-
! colspan="10" style="background:#dcdcdc; text-align:center"| Defenders

|-
! colspan="10" style="background:#dcdcdc; text-align:center"| Midfielders

|-
! colspan="10" style="background:#dcdcdc; text-align:center"| Forwards

|-
! colspan="10" style="background:#dcdcdc; text-align:center"| Players transferred out during the season

Top scorers
This includes all competitive matches. The list is sorted by shirt number when total goals are equal.

References

External links
 Official Atalanta BC Website
 Tutto Atalanta: Atalanta News & Gossip

Atalanta B.C. seasons
Atalanta